Oscar Alejandro Aravena Loncón (born in Chile) is a Chilean former footballer who played as a striker.

Career
In 1998 and 1999, played in A. Fernández Vial. 

In 2000 Óscar signed in CD Universidad de Concepción.

In 2001 returned to A. Fernández Vial.

In 2003, Aravena signed for PSM Makassar in the Indonesian league, coinciding with his compatriot Jorge Toledo, where he was the top scorer with 31 goals. After that, he played for Indonesian clubs Persela Lamongan and Persija Jakarta, but failed to play as well.

In 2010, Aravena signed for Bali Devata in the independent Liga Primer Indonesia. However, because the league was not recognized by the Indonesian football federation, he was subsequently banned from playing in the Indonesian league.

Personal life
He is nicknamed Milo.

Honours

Club
Persela Lamongan
 Piala Gubernur Jatim: 2003

Individual
 Piala Gubernur Jatim Top Scorer: 2003

References

1978 births
Living people
Sportspeople from Concepción, Chile
Chilean people of Mapuche descent
Mapuche sportspeople
Chilean footballers
Chilean expatriate footballers
C.D. Arturo Fernández Vial footballers
Universidad de Concepción footballers
Persela Lamongan players
PSM Makassar players
Persija Jakarta players
Bali Devata F.C. players
Lota Schwager footballers
Primera B de Chile players
Indonesian Premier Division players
Chilean expatriate sportspeople in Indonesia
Expatriate footballers in Indonesia
Association football forwards
Indigenous sportspeople of the Americas